La Hora Cero (Spanish for "Zero Hour") was a professional wrestling major show event produced by Consejo Mundial de Lucha Libre (CMLL), which took place on January 11, 2009 in Arena Mexico, Mexico City, Mexico. Six matches took place at La Hora Cero, with the main event being a multi-man Steel Cage where the last man in the cage would lose his mask. 13 Mini-Estrella (the Spanish term for dwarf wrestlers) took part in the match; the match ended with Shockercito and Pierrothito being the last two men in the cage; Pierrothito subsequently pinned Shockercito to win the match. Following the match Shockercito was unmasked per Lucha Libre traditions. The show also featured four under card matches.

Background
The event featured six professional wrestling matches with different wrestlers involved in pre-existing scripted feuds or storylines. Wrestlers portray either villains (referred to as Rudos in Mexico) or fan favorites (Técnicos in Mexico) as they compete in wrestling matches with pre-determined outcomes.

Results

Cage match order of escape

References

2009 in professional wrestling
CMLL Infierno en el Ring
Events in Mexico City